Michael Ryan Yunck (August 19, 1918 – September 1, 1984) was a United States Marine Corps aviator and a flying ace of World War II, credited with shooting down five enemy aircraft in aerial combat.

Yunck was born in Detroit, Michigan, on August 19, 1918. His action was on October 26 – December 10, 1942 in action against enemy Japanese forces in the Solomon Islands area. He was a part of the Battalion, Marine Observation Squadron 251 (VMO-251). He was awarded the Silver Star for his actions in the war. He later served as a helicopter pilot in the Vietnam War, where he was awarded a second Silver Star after his leg had to be amputated. He was also presented with the Distinguished Flying Cross.

References

1918 births
1984 deaths
United States Marine Corps personnel of the Vietnam War
American World War II flying aces
Burials at Arlington National Cemetery
Military personnel from Detroit
Recipients of the Distinguished Flying Cross (United States)
Recipients of the Silver Star
United States Marine Corps colonels
United States Marine Corps pilots of World War II